Muchan may refer to:
 Muchan, Alborz, a village in Iran
 Muchan, Chaharmahal and Bakhtiari, a village in Iran
 Muchan, Markazi, a village in Iran
 Kalarippayattu stick fighting
 Muchan a surname in the West of Scotland e.g. Ryan Muchan